Dicoma is a genus of flowering plants in the sunflower family, native to Africa and the Middle East.

Species 
Species in Dicoma include:

See also
 Macledium

References

 
Mutisieae
Asteraceae genera
Taxonomy articles created by Polbot